This is a list of years in Sri Lanka.

Anuradhapura period (377 BC–1017 AD)

Polonnaruwa period (1017–1232)

Transitional period (1232–1597)

Kandyan period (1597–1815)

British Ceylon period (1815–1948)

Sri Lanka (1948–present)

See also
 Outline of Sri Lanka
 Timeline of Sri Lankan history

 
Sri Lankan history timelines
Sri Lanka history-related lists
Sri Lanka